Moïse Sakava Sangola (born 26 December 2000) is a Cameroonian professional footballer who plays as a midfielder for FC Differdange 03, on loan from Reims.

Club career
A youth product of Coton Sport in Cameroon, Sakava signed a professional contract with Reims on 18 January 2019. He made his professional debut with Reims in a 4–0 Ligue 1 win over Montpellier on 25 October 2020.

References

External links
 
 JMG Profile

2000 births
Living people
People from Far North Region (Cameroon)
Cameroonian footballers
Cameroon youth international footballers
Association football midfielders
Stade de Reims players
FC Differdange 03 players
Ligue 1 players
Luxembourg National Division players
Championnat National 2 players
Cameroonian expatriate footballers
Cameroonian expatriate sportspeople in France
Expatriate footballers in France
Expatriate footballers in Luxembourg